Beyköy is a Turkish place name and may refer to:

 Beyköy, a village in the Lefkoşa district of Northern Cyprus
 Beyköy, Düzce, a town in the district of Düzce, Düzce Province, Turkey
 Beyköy, Emirdağ, a village in the district of Emirdağ, Afyonkarahisar Province, Turkey
 Beyköy, İhsaniye, a village in the district of İhsaniye, Afyon Province, Turkey
 Beyköy, İncirliova, a village in the district of İncirliova, Aydın Province, Turkey
 Beyköy, Köşk, a village in the district of Köşk, Aydın Province, Turkey
 Beyköy, Bandırma, a village in the district of Bandırma, Balıkesir Province, Turkey
 Beyköy, Çivril
 Beyköy, Ilgaz
 Beyköy, Keşan
 Beyköy, Savaştepe, a village
 Beyköy, Susurluk, a village
 Beyköy, Taşköprü, a village
 Beyköy, Yeşilova

See also
 Beyköyü, Karataş, a village in Karataş district of Adana Province, Turkey